Prostate cancer, hereditary, 4 is a protein that in humans is encoded by the HPC4 gene.

References